"Hit It Again" is a song by American electronic music duo 3OH!3.

While on Warped Tour and AP Tour in 2009, they performed the song live and got a good response. During a live web chat to promote "Touchin' on My," they said that the song is "dead." In response to that, fans petitioned for 3OH!3 to release the track. After a few months, Nathaniel Motte of 3OH!3 came across the petition ended up releasing the track exclusively on iTunes.

Chart performance
"Hit It Again" charted for one week on the Billboard Hot 100, for the week ending January 8, 2011, at number 66.

References

External links

2010 singles
3OH!3 songs
Songs written by Nathaniel Motte
Songs written by Sam Hollander
Songs written by Dave Katz
2010 songs
Song recordings produced by S*A*M and Sluggo
Songs written by Sean Foreman